Margaret Bertasi (born November 1, 1992) is an American rower.

She won a gold medal at the 2019 World Rowing Championships.

References

External links
 

1992 births
Living people
American female rowers
World Rowing Championships medalists for the United States
21st-century American women